The Greater Hyderabad Municipal Corporation, commonly known as the GHMC is the civic body that oversees Hyderabad, the capital and largest city of the Indian state of Telangana. It is the local government for the city of Hyderabad . It is one of the largest municipal corporations in India with a population of 7.9 million and an area of 650 km².

History

Hyderabad Municipal Board and Chaderghat Municipal Board 
In 1869, Municipal administration was first introduced for the city of Hyderabad. The city of Hyderabad was divided into four and the suburbs of Chaderghat were divided into five divisions. The whole management of both the city and the suburbs was handled by the then City Police Commissioner, Kotwal-e-Baldia.

In the same year, Sir Salar Jung-1, the then Prime Minister of Hyderabad State under the Nizam, has constituted the Department of Municipal and Road Maintenance. He also appointed a Municipal Commissioner for Hyderabad Board and Chaderghat Board. At that time, city was just 55 km2 with a population of 3.5 lakhs.

In 1886, the suburban area of Chaderghat was handed over to a separate officer and then Chaderghat became Chaderghat Municipality.

In 1921 Hyderabad Municipality has increased to 84 km2.

Hyderabad Municipal Corporation 
In 1933, Chaderghat Municipality was merged with Hyderabad Municipality to form Hyderabad Municipal Corporation and was given statutory status under the Hyderabad Municipal Act. During the following year (1934), the first elections were held for Municipal Corporation and a Standing Committee was appointed at that time.

Jubilee Hills Municipality
In the year 1937, Jubilee Hills Municipality was formed by the amalgamation of Jubilee Hills and Banjara Hills. Later, in 1942, the corporation status for the city has been removed due to some issues.

Secunderabad Municipality
In the year 1945, Secunderabad Municipality was formed. Again in 1950, Hyderabad regained its lost Corporation status along with the amalgamation of Jubilee Hills Municipality.

Municipal Corporation of Hyderabad 
The Hyderabad Corporation and the Secunderabad Corporation, were established in 1950 via the Hyderabad Corporation Act. Jubilee Hills Municipality merged in Hyderabad Corporation during this time. In 1955, the Hyderabad Municipal Corporation Act merged the municipal corporations overseeing Hyderabad and neighbouring Secunderabad.

Once again in 1955, both the municipal corporations of Hyderabad and Secunderabad were merged to form Municipal Corporation of Hyderabad (MCH). In 1956, Hyderabad became capital of Andhra Pradesh after the state was formed.

Greater Hyderabad Municipal Corporation 
The Greater Hyderabad Municipal Corporation was formed on 16 April 2007 by merging 12 municipalities and 8 gram panchayats with the Municipal Corporation of Hyderabad. The municipalities are L. B. Nagar, Gaddi annaram, Uppal Kalan, Malkajgiri, Kapra, Alwal, Qutubullapur, Kukatpally, Serilingampalle, Rajendranagar, Ramachandrapuram, and Patancheru. These municipalities are in Rangareddy district and Medak district. The panchayats are Shamshabad, Satamarai, Jallapalli, Mamdipalli, Mankhal, Almasguda, Sardanagar and Ravirala.

The Government Order 261 was initially issued in July 2005. Now, the Supreme Court has rejected the plea to interfere into the matter, the Andhra Pradesh government has passed the GO 261 that is related to the creation of Greater Hyderabad on 16 April 2007. Earlier, the twin cities of Hyderabad and Secunderabad had a population of 45 lakhs living in an area of 172 km². The new urban agglomeration sprawls across  with a population of 67 lakhs. The erstwhile city of the Nizams has now transformed into an area far greater.

The Government has decided to divide the Greater Hyderabad Municipal Corporation into Six zones in 2019 (south, east, north, north east, west and central zones), 30 circles and 150 wards. Old City has about 50 wards in seven circles. Each ward would cover about 40,000 - 50,000 people. The GHMC is headed by a Commissioner and also has a Special Commissioner both of whom belong to IAS. Each zone will have a zonal commissioner, an officer of the rank of additional commissioner with a deputy municipal commissioners heading every circle. There will also be a separate engineering wing with an Engineer in Chief and Chief Engineer at head office level and a superintending engineer for each zone; a town planning wing with Additional Commissioner (Planning) and a Chief City Planner at the head office level and a city planner for each zone.

Secunderabad cantonment does not come under purview of GHMC. There are eight civilian wards in Secunderbad Cantonment Board, with a population of four lakh.

In February 2018, Greater Hyderabad Municipal Corporation (GHMC) has listed its municipal bonds on the Bombay Stock Exchange (BSE). The civic body became the second to list its bonds on the BSE’s newly launched bond platform.

Jurisdiction 
The Greater Hyderabad Municipal Corporation (GHMC) comprises the limits of the erstwhile Municipal Corporation of Hyderabad (MCH) along with the 10 municipalities and 8 panchayats in erstwhile Ranga Reddy district and other 2 municipalities in erstwhile Medak district.

The 10 municipalities in erstwhile Ranga Reddy district are L. B. Nagar, Gaddi annaram, Uppal Kalan, Malkajgiri, Kapra, Alwal, Qutubullapur, Kukatpally, Serilingampalle and Rajendranagar. The 8 panchayats in erstwhile Ranga Reddy district are Shamshabad, Satamarai, Jallapalli, Mamdipalli, Mankhal, Almasguda, Sardanagar and Ravirala while the 2 municipalities in erstwhile sangareddy district are: Ramachandrapuram and Patancheru.

At present, GHMC is spread across 4 districts namely Hyderabad district, Medchal district, Ranga Reddy district, and Sangareddy district with a jurisdiction of 900 sq.km.

Administration
The Greater Hyderabad Municipal Corporation is headed by a Municipal Commissioner, an IAS officer. The commissioner wields the executive power of the house. A quinquennial election is held to elect corporators to power. The corporators are responsible for overseeing that their constituencies have the basic civic infrastructure in place, and that there is no lacuna on the part of the authorities.

Executive 
The Andhra Pradesh Government has appointed CVSK Sarma as the first Chief Commissioner of GHMC in 2007. There is also a provision for a directly elected mayor of Hyderabad. However, the Chief Commissioner can allocate more funds and in general has more power

Legislature 

The term of the legislature of precursor to the GHMC namely the Municipal Corporation of Hyderabad, then simply called by the same name ended before the formation of the GHMC. The Standing Committee of the Legislature takes a major role in the decision making process within the legislature when it is in session. 64 ex-officio members including 5 Lok Sabha MPs whose constituencies are in GHMC jurisdiction vote in GHMC election.

The Mayor is the head of the house. They function through four organs namely Council, Mayor, standing Committees and commissioner. The council, which consists of the registered voters of the corporation, is a deliberative body.

Administrative divisions of GHMC 

The Greater Hyderabad Municipal Corporation (GHMC) is the civic body that oversees Hyderabad, the capital and largest city in the Indian state of Telangana. It is the local government for the cities of Hyderabad and Secunderabad. Its geographical area covers most of the urban development agency the Hyderabad Metropolitan Development Authority (HMDA).  24 Assembly constituencies comes under GHMC. 64 ex-officio members including 5 Lok Sabha MPs whose constituencies are in GHMC jurisdiction vote in GHMC election.

Responsibilities 
The body is responsible for administering and providing basic infrastructure to the city.
 Building and Maintenance of roads, streets and flyovers.
 Garbage disposal and street cleanliness
 Public Municipal schools
 Street lighting
 Maintenance of parks and open spaces
 Urban development and city planning of new areas.
 Registering of births and deaths.
 Health & Sanitation
GHMC co-ordinates with various other government organizations like HMDA, HMR, HMWS&SB, TSRTC, Hyderabad Traffic Police, TSSPDCL, Irrigation etc. for delivering these basic urban services.

Elections

2020 GHMC election 

After 2016, third GHMC elections were held in December 2020.

2016 GHMC election 

Second GHMC election were conduced in February 2016.

2009 GHMC election

2002 MCH election 
Last Municipal Corporation of Hyderabad (MCH) elections were held in 2002 for a total of 99 wards.

See also

 List of Hyderabad Corporation wards, circles and zones

References

External links

Municipal corporations in Telangana
 
Government of Hyderabad, India
1869 establishments in India